Louis Doremus Huntoon, E.M., M.A. (1869–1937) was an American mining engineer, born at Paterson, New Jersey, and educated at the New York College of Pharmacy and the School of Mines of Columbia University (1895).  He was employed as a chemist and assayer in Colorado in 1895-96 and mining and metallurgical engineer in New York in 1896-1903, and he remained in New York afterwards.  He became consulting engineer in New York City after 1911.

References

External links
Obituary from New York Times (copy on genealogical website)

American mining engineers
People from Paterson, New Jersey
Columbia School of Engineering and Applied Science alumni
1869 births
1937 deaths
Engineers from New Jersey